Jerry Ferrara (born November 25, 1979) is an American actor known for his role as Turtle on the HBO comedy series Entourage, and starred on the Starz drama series Power as Joe Proctor.

Life and career
Ferrara is a native of the Bensonhurst, Brooklyn neighborhood of New York City. He is of Italian descent.

He graduated from New Utrecht High School.  Ferrara began studying theater in college, where he was inspired by a teacher to pursue a career in acting. An agent he met at a talent showcase encouraged him to move to Los Angeles, where he quickly landed his first role on The King of Queens. Other television parts soon followed. Jerry was then cast in the independent feature Cross Bronx, which premiered at the 2004 Tribeca Film Festival.

In an interview about his breakout role on Entourage, Ferrara revealed that when he told his friends he had landed a major part in a television pilot, they asked, "How about you get a dog who becomes your best friend and you name him Awnold??" Kevin Connolly has said of his Entourage co-star that "Jerry's very domesticated. He's probably the most different from his character. He's like 180 degrees in the opposite direction."

Ferrara once made an appearance in character as Turtle for a DirecTV commercial. His dialogue was mixed with a clip from an Entourage episode for humorous effect.

Ferrara is also co-founder of Fat Sal's deli in West Hollywood, California. In 2010, Ferrara dropped weight and lost 60 pounds with a new outlook on health and fitness.

Filmography

Film

Television

References

Further reading
 OK!: Jerry Ferrara Interview with Staff (July 7, 2008)
 PR.com: Jerry Ferrara Interview with Allison Kugel (July 7, 2011)

External links
 

1979 births
Male actors from New York City
American male film actors
American people of Italian descent
American male television actors
Living people
People from Bensonhurst, Brooklyn
New Utrecht High School alumni
American restaurateurs